This is a list of local government areas in Scotland from 1930 to 1975.

The list contains the areas of local authorities as created by the Local Government (Scotland) Act 1929, as amended by the Local Government (Scotland) Act 1947. These areas were abolished in 1975 by the Local Government (Scotland) Act 1973 when a system of regions and districts replaced them. The district in which the abolished area was included is indicated.

Background
From 1930 to 1975 there were the following types of local government areas in Scotland:

County-level authorities
Counties of cities: these were the four largest burghs: they exercised the powers of both a county council and burgh. As such they were effectively unitary authorities. They were governed by city corporations headed by a lord provost.
Counties: There were thirty-three counties covering the area outside the counties of cities. In the case of twenty-nine counties they were governed by a county council consisting partly of members nominated by the town councils of burghs in the county and partly by directly elected councillors for the "landward" areas of the county. The chairman of a county council was known as the "convener".
Combined counties: Two small counties, Nairnshire and Kinross-shire were combined with the neighbouring counties of Moray and Perthshire for most local government purposes. In these "combined counties", there was a joint county council. The separate county councils continued to exist, however, and were responsible for minor local government functions.

Sub-county authorities

Large burghs: The 1929 Act constituted twenty burghs as "large burghs". These towns were largely independent from the counties in which they were situated. The number of large burghs was later increased to twenty-one, with the addition of the new town of East Kilbride. The town councils of large burghs were responsible for all local services except higher-level activities such as police and education, which were provided by the county council.
Small burghs: The remaining burghs became "small burghs", yielding many of their powers to the reconstituted county councils.
Landward districts: The "landward" area of each county was that part not included in a burgh. County councils were required to divide this area into districts. This was done by grouping electoral divisions (the areas for which county councillors were elected). Each district was governed by a district council consisting of ex officio the county councillors for the divisions and a number of directly elected district councillors.

Counties of cities

County of Aberdeen

Small burghs

Landward districts

County of Angus

Large burgh

Small burghs

Landward districts

County of Argyll

Small burghs

Landward districts

County of Ayr

Large burghs

Small burghs

Landward districts

County of Banff

Small burghs

Landward districts

County of Berwick

Small burghs

Landward districts

County of Bute

Small burghs

Landward districts

County of Caithness

Small burghs

Landward districts

County of Clackmannan

Small burghs

Landward districts

County of Dumfries

Large burgh

Small burghs

Landward districts

County of Dunbarton

Large burghs

Small burghs

Landward districts

County of East Lothian

Small burghs

Landward districts

County of Fife

Large burghs

Small burghs

Landward districts

County of Inverness

Large burgh

Small burghs

Landward districts

County of Kincardine

Small burghs

Landward districts

County of Kirkcudbright

Small burghs

Landward districts

County of Lanark

Large burghs

Small burghs

Landward districts

County of Midlothian

Small burghs

Landward districts

Combined County of Moray and Nairn

Small burghs : County of Moray

Small burghs : County of Nairn

Landward districts: County of Moray

Landward districts: County of Nairn

County of Orkney

Small burghs

Landward districts

County of Peebles

Small burghs

Landward districts

Combined County of Perth and Kinross

Large burgh

Small burgh: County of Kinross

Small burghs: County of Perth

Landward districts: County of Kinross
The County of Kinross was not divided into districts: the Kinross County Council performed district-level local government functions.

Landward districts: County of Perth

County of Renfrew

Large burghs

Small burghs

Landward districts

County of Ross and Cromarty

Small burghs

Landward districts

County of Roxburgh

Small burghs

Landward districts

County of Selkirk

Small burghs

Landward districts

County of Stirling

Large burghs

Small burghs

Landward districts

County of Sutherland

Small burgh

Landward districts

County of West Lothian

Small burghs

Landward districts

County of Wigtown

Small burghs

Landward districts

County of Zetland

Small burgh

Landward districts

References

See also

Subdivisions of Scotland

1930
20th century in Scotland
Local govt areas